Lahore Badami Bagh Bus Terminal (or Lari Adda), is one of three major bus terminals in Lahore, Punjab, Pakistan. It is located near Badami Bagh railway station on Circular Road. Badami Bagh serves as the major entry and exit point for all bus travelers.

See also
 Lahore Jinnah Bus Terminal (Thokar Niaz Beg)

References

Bus stations in Lahore